Mohit  is an Indian actor who appears in Hindi, Telugu and Tamil films. His first Telugu film Aithe won the National Film Award for the Best Telugu Feature Film. The next year, he starred in the thriller film Aithe Enti (2004). He was seen in the 2010 films Dulha Mil Gaya and Do Dooni Chaar although his role in the latter was shortened. He was also adjudged first runner-up on Zee TV's reality show Zee Cinestars Ki Khoj in 2004. In 2021, he played a lead role in Flight (2021).

Filmography

References

External links
 
 'Mohit Chadda - Official website'
 'Mohit Chadda - In News'

Indian male film actors
Male actors in Tamil cinema
Living people
Male actors in Hindi cinema
Male actors from Mumbai
Year of birth missing (living people)